Barbara Boggs Sigmund (May 27, 1939 – October 10, 1990) was an American writer, Democratic politician, and civic leader. She served as a Mercer County Freeholder and mayor of the Borough of Princeton, New Jersey from 1983 to 1990. She finished fourth in the primary for U.S. Senate in 1982 and a distant second in the primary for Governor of New Jersey in 1989.

She was the daughter Hale Boggs and Lindy Boggs, who both represented Louisiana in the United States House of Representatives.

Biography
A graduate of Stone Ridge School of the Sacred Heart and Manhattanville College, she taught at the Stuart Country Day School of the Sacred Heart (Princeton, N.J.), which, in honor of her life, now annually awards the Barbara Boggs Sigmund Alumnae Award.

Sigmund worked as a letter writer for President John F. Kennedy, and served as a member of the Mercer County, New Jersey Board of Chosen Freeholders. In 1982, she finished fourth out of nine in the 1982 New Jersey Democratic Senate primary, which was won by Frank Lautenberg (who went on to serve nearly 29 years in the Senate). The other two candidates with more votes were former United States Congressmen. She was elected Mayor of the Borough of Princeton, New Jersey from 1983 to her death in 1990.

Sigmund founded Womanspace, a Mercer County, New Jersey non-profit agency that provides services — 24-hour hotlines, crisis intervention, emergency shelter, counseling, court advocacy, and housing — to victims and survivors of domestic and sexual violence.

In 1990, Sigmund died of cancer, aged 51, following an 8-year battle. She had lost an eye to the disease, necessitating an eyepatch. The patch became iconic when she attended events as the mayor, sporting an eye patch matched to her outfit.

Her siblings were Cokie Roberts and Tommy Boggs. In addition to her mother and siblings, she was survived by her husband, Paul Sigmund, and their three sons, Paul Jr., David, and Stephen.

Though her political work was in New Jersey, Sigmund was inducted posthumously in 2005 into the Louisiana Political Museum and Hall of Fame in Winnfield. The Hall of Fame had earlier inducted her father and mother.

Notes

Further reading

1939 births
1990 deaths
County commissioners in New Jersey
Women mayors of places in New Jersey
American people with disabilities
American politicians with disabilities
Deaths from cancer in New Jersey
Politicians from New Orleans
Manhattanville College alumni
Mayors of Princeton, New Jersey
20th-century American politicians
20th-century American women politicians
Catholics from Louisiana
Boggs family
Claiborne family
Candidates in the 1982 United States elections